Clayton "Clay" French (born October 7, 1980) is an American mixed martial artist who fought on Pride Fighting Championships, Sengoku, KOTC and other several fighting organizations. He holds a notable victory over TUF winner Mac Danzig by split decision and has trained with former UFC welterweight champion Matt Hughes.

Biography
Clay wrestled at Eastern Illinois University where he was coached by Matt Hughes who turned him on to Mixed martial arts. Clay became a KOTC lightweight title holder. He has since started fighting at Sengoku in Japan and he enjoys the Japanese fighting culture.
he then began fighting in Titan Fighting Championships. Clay was the head coach of wrestling at St. Laurence High School from 2015-2017.
Before Clay moved to Morton Freshman center, he worked as a computer teacher in a school nearby, Burnham Elementry.
Clay has since moved to be a teacher at Morton Freshman Center in Cicero, IL. In the 2017-2018 School year, he is a teacher in the TSI department, a part of the school meant to teach students how to work with computers.

Championships and Accomplishments

Mixed Martial Arts
King of the Cage
King of the Cage World Lightweight Champion (One time)
Three successful title defenses
Extreme Challenge
Extreme Challenge 70 Four-Man Lightweight Tournament Finalist

Mixed martial arts record

|-
| Loss
| align=center| 19–7
| Thiago Meller
| TKO (punches)
| XFCI - International 1 
| 
| align=center| 1
| align=center| 3:39
| Sao Paulo, Brazil
| 
|-
| Win
| align=center| 19–6
| James Krause
| Decision (split)
| Titan Fighting Championships 19
| 
| align=center| 3
| align=center| 5:00
| Kansas City, Kansas, United States
| 
|-
| Win
| align=center| 18–6
| Billy Stamp
| Decision (split)
| Ruckus Entertainment: Ruckus Invades Navy Pier
| 
| align=center| 3
| align=center| 5:00
| Chicago, Illinois, United States
| 
|-
| Win
| align=center| 17–6
| Sean Wilson
| Submission (rear-naked choke)
| KOTC: Turbulence 2
| 
| align=center| 1
| align=center| 3:39
| Lac du Flambeau (town), Wisconsin, United States
| 
|-
| Loss
| align=center| 16–6
| Eiji Mitsuoka
| Submission (guillotine choke)
| World Victory Road Presents: Sengoku 9
| 
| align=center| 1
| align=center| 1:51
| Saitama, Saitama, Japan
| 
|-
| Win
| align=center| 16–5
| Bryan Neville
| Submission (neck crank)
| KOTC: The Renewal
| 
| align=center| 1
| align=center| 0:28
| Indianapolis, Indiana, United States
| 
|-
| Loss
| align=center| 15–5
| Michael Johnson
| Submission (kimura)
| FFC - Fuel Fight Club
| 
| align=center| 1
| align=center| 3:16
| Lake Ozark, Missouri, United States
| 
|-
| Loss
| align=center| 15–4
| Rory MacDonald
| KO (punches)
| KOTC - Grinder
| 
| align=center| 2
| align=center| 4:26
| Calgary, Alberta, Canada
| Lost KOTC lightweight championship
|-
| Loss
| align=center| 15–3
| Satoru Kitaoka
| Submission (achilles lock)
| World Victory Road Presents: Sengoku 4
| 
| align=center| 1
| align=center| 0:31
| Saitama, Saitama, Japan
| Sengoku 2008 lightweight tournament opening round
|-
| Win
| align=center| 15–2
| Jameel Massouh
| Submission (rear-naked choke)
| AMMA 1 - Adrenaline MMA 1
| 
| align=center| 2
| align=center| 3:17
| Chicago, Illinois, United States
| 
|-
| Win
| align=center| 14–2
| Jason Ireland
| Decision (unanimous)
| KOTC: Bad Boys
| 
| align=center| 3
| align=center| 5:00
| Mount Pleasant, Michigan, United States
| Defended KOTC lightweight championship
|-
| Win
| align=center| 13–2
| Bobby Mosley
| Submission (armbar)
| Mainstream MMA 7 - Vengeance
| 
| align=center| 1
| align=center| 1:29
| Cedar Rapids, Iowa, United States
| 
|-
| Win
| align=center| 12–2
| Sam Jackson
| Submission (rear naked choke)
| EC 82 - Extreme Challenge 82
| 
| align=center| 1
| align=center| 4:22
| Springfield, Illinois, United States
| 
|-
| Win
| align=center| 11–2
| Buddy Clinton
| TKO (cut)
| KOTC: Collision Course
| 
| align=center| 3
| align=center| 3:26
| San Jacinto, California, United States
| Defended KOTC lightweight championship
|-
| Win
| align=center| 10–2
| Buddy Clinton
| Decision (split)
| KOTC: Damage Control
| 
| align=center| 3
| align=center| 5:00
| Chicago, Illinois, United States
| Defended KOTC lightweight championship
|-
| Win
| align=center| 9–2
| Dominic Bjerke
| TKO
| CFC 8 - Courage Fighting Championships 8
| 
| align=center| 1
| align=center| 1:18
| Decatur, Illinois, United States
| 
|-
| Win
| align=center| 8–2
| Mac Danzig
| Decision (split)
| KOTC: Hard Knocks
| 
| align=center| 3
| align=center| 5:00
| Rockford, Illinois, United States
| Won KOTC lightweight championship
|-
| Loss
| align=center| 7–2
| Shinya Aoki
| Submission (flying triangle choke)
| Pride - Bushido 13
| 
| align=center| 1
| align=center| 3:57
| Yokohama, Japan
| 
|-
| Loss
| align=center| 7–1
| Justin James
| Submission (armbar)
| EC 70 - Extreme Challenge 70
| 
| align=center| 1
| align=center| 2:06
| Hayward, Wisconsin, United States
| Extreme Challenge 70 four-man lightweight tournament finals
|-
| Win
| align=center| 7–0
| Alonzo Martinez
| Submission (rear-naked choke)
| EC 70 - Extreme Challenge 70
| 
| align=center| 1
| align=center| 3:34
| Hayward, Wisconsin, United States
| Extreme Challenge 70 four-man lightweight tournament opening round
|-
| Win
| align=center| 6–0
| James Kugler
| Submission (choke)
| CFC 6 - Courage Fighting Championships 6
| 
| align=center| 1
| align=center| N/A
| Decatur, Illinois, United States
| 
|-
| Win
| align=center| 5–0
| Alex Carter
| Submission (armbar)
| IC 29 - Iowa Challenge 29
| 
| align=center| 1
| align=center| 0:16
| Quincy, Illinois, United States
| 
|-
| Win
| align=center| 4–0
| Norm Alexander
| Submission (armbar)
| CFC 5 - Courage Fighting Championships 5
| 
| align=center| 1
| align=center| 4:45
| Decatur, Illinois, United States
| 
|-
| Win
| align=center| 3–0
| Josh Arocho
| Submission (rear-naked choke)
| XFO 7 - Outdoor War
| 
| align=center| 1
| align=center| 3:28
| Island Lake, Illinois, United States
| 
|-
| Win
| align=center| 2–0
| Joe Veres
| Submission (guillotine choke)
| CFC 2 - Courage Fighting Championships 2
| 
| align=center| 2
| align=center| 0:59
| Decatur, Illinois, United States
| 
|-
| Win
| align=center| 1–0
| Eric Gwaltney
| Decision (unanimous)
| SC 19 - Silverback Classic 19
| 
| align=center| 2
| align=center| 5:00
| Canton, Illinois, United States
|

External links

References

American male mixed martial artists
Mixed martial artists utilizing wrestling
1980 births
Living people
People from Villa Park, Illinois
People from Mokena, Illinois